A la découverte des Français is a documentary series directed by Jean-Claude Bergeret with Jacques Krier, hosted by Étienne Lalou, broadcast from April 5, 1957 to May 11, 1960 on RTF Television. The show was a 14 episode which covered everyday French lives of Fisherman and miners etc.

References

1957 French television series debuts
1960 French television series endings
1950s French television series
French-language television shows
French documentary television series